

Group A

Jordan

Kuwait

Morocco U23

Palestine

Sudan

Group B

Bahrain

Lebanon
 Head coach:  Richard Tardy

|-

|}

Saudi Arabia
Head Coach:  Gerard van der Lem

|}

Syria

Yemen

References

External links
 2002 Arab Cup squads

Squads
2002